Pilar Maekawa Moreno (born August 23, 1994) is a Mexican former competitive ice dancer. With her brother, Leonardo Maekawa Moreno, she competed at three Four Continents Championships from 2013 to 2015. The two were coached by Marina Zueva, Matt Willis, and Oleg Epstein.

Programs 
(with Leonardo Maekawa Moreno)

Competitive highlights 
CS: Challenger Series; JGP: Junior Grand Prix

With Leonardo Maekawa Moreno

References

External links 
 

1994 births
Mexican ice dancers
Living people
Sportspeople from Mexico City